The Strand is a street in Auckland, New Zealand's most populous city.

Demographics

The Strand had a population of 1,353 at the 2018 New Zealand census, a decrease of 129 people (−8.7%) since the 2013 census, and an increase of 165 people (13.9%) since the 2006 census. There were 450 households, comprising 705 males and 648 females, giving a sex ratio of 1.09 males per female. The median age was 28.0 years (compared with 37.4 years nationally), with 63 people (4.7%) aged under 15 years, 741 (54.8%) aged 15 to 29, 501 (37.0%) aged 30 to 64, and 48 (3.5%) aged 65 or older.

Ethnicities were 45.7% European/Pākehā, 3.3% Māori, 2.7% Pacific peoples, 40.1% Asian, and 14.2% other ethnicities. People may identify with more than one ethnicity.

The percentage of people born overseas was 68.1, compared with 27.1% nationally.

Although some people chose not to answer the census's question about religious affiliation, 52.1% had no religion, 26.6% were Christian, 5.8% were Hindu, 4.2% were Muslim, 2.2% were Buddhist and 4.4% had other religions.

Of those at least 15 years old, 561 (43.5%) people had a bachelor's or higher degree, and 33 (2.6%) people had no formal qualifications. The median income was $28,500, compared with $31,800 nationally. 201 people (15.6%) earned over $70,000 compared to 17.2% nationally. The employment status of those at least 15 was that 663 (51.4%) people were employed full-time, 258 (20.0%) were part-time, and 90 (7.0%) were unemployed.

History
The Strand was one of Auckland's earliest streets, existing by 1843. It was formed to provide road access between the city and Parnell, New Zealand. It formed part of the eastern boundary of the Town of Auckland in 1848 but received poor funding for its formation: £1,200 per mile compared to £2,000 per mile for Queen Street.

Motorway access began with the Auckland Southern Motorway gaining on and offramps to Grafton Road between 1975 and 1978.

The Strand originally met Parnell Rise at what is now Shipwright Lane, but was realigned to provide a direct junction with Stanley Street with a new bridge taking the railway over it as part of the Grafton Gully motorway project in 2001–2004.

Notable locations

Railway bridge and viaduct, Parnell Rise, 1866, one of the oldest remaining railway bridges in the North Island.
Swan Hotel, 31-35 Parnell Rise, before 1856, one of the earliest timber hotels in Auckland.
The Strand Station, Beach Road, 1930, formerly the main Auckland Railway station, now a terminus for long-distance trains.

References

Streets in Auckland